"Row, Row, Row Your Boat" is an English language nursery rhyme and a popular children's song, often sung in a round. It has a Roud Folk Song Index number of 19236.

Bing Crosby included the song in a medley on his album 101 Gang Songs (1961). Crosby also used the song as part of a round with his family during his concert at the London Palladium in 1976. The performance was captured on the album Bing Crosby Live at the London Palladium.

Lyrics

The most common modern version is often sung as a round for up to four voice parts. A possible arrangement for SATB is as follows:
{| class="wikitable"
!Soprano
!Alto
!Tenor
!Bass
|-
|Row, row, row your boat
|
|
|
|-
|Gently down the stream.
|Row, row, row your boat
|
|
|-
|Merrily, merrily, merrily, merrily,
|Gently down the stream.
|Row, row, row your boat
|
|-
|Life is but a dream.
|Merrily, merrily, merrily, merrily,
|Gently down the stream.
|Row, row, row your boat
|-
|
|Life is but a dream.
|Merrily, merrily, merrily, merrily,
|Gently down the stream.
|-
|
|
|Life is but a dream.
|Merrily, merrily, merrily, merrily,
|-
|
|
|
|Life is but a dream.
|} The text above is often sung multiple times in succession to allow for the different voices to interweave with each other, forming four-part harmony.

Melody

Origins

The earliest printing of the song is from 1852, when the lyrics were published with similar lyrics to those used today, but with a very different tune. It was reprinted again two years later with the same lyrics and another tune. The modern tune was first recorded with the lyrics in 1881, mentioning Eliphalet Oram Lyte in The Franklin Square Song Collection but not making it clear whether he was the composer or adapter.

Legacy and alternative versions
The nursery rhyme is well known, appearing in several films, e.g. Star Trek V, Eternal Sunshine of the Spotless Mind and Manos: The Hands of Fate. People often add additional verses, a form of children's street culture, with the intent of either extending the song or (especially in the case of more irreverent versions) to make it funny, parody it, or substitute another sensibility for the perceived innocent one of the original. In Bean, Rowan Atkinson (Mr. Bean) and Peter MacNicol (David Langley) also used this parody singing in the film.  Don Music, a muppet character in Sesame Street, changed the lyrics to feature a car instead of a boat.

Versions include:

and

and

 and

and

and

and

and

Notes and references

1852 songs
American nursery rhymes
American children's songs
American folk songs
Songs about boats
Traditional children's songs
Rounds (music)